6180 the moon is a minimalistic puzzle-platform game developed by Turtle Cream and Jongmin Baek. The game's soundtrack was composed by Seongyi Yi and Chaeeun Kim. It was initially released for Microsoft Windows in March 2013 as part of an Indie Royale bundle. The game follows the story of the Moon searching for the Sun after it has gone missing, leaving the people of Earth to suffer in an eternal night.

Gameplay 

The player controls the Moon, shown as a simple white circle. The Moon only has the ability to jump and move left and right, however, the tops and the bottom of the level boundaries loop, giving the player more options to tackle the platforming challenges the game presents. The goal of each level is to get from the starting point to the exit block. Every level is grouped into a certain "world" each of which is based on a planet (it also includes the Sun), with each world having a different thematic mechanic.

Plot 
The Moon prepares to set and allow the Sun to rise, however, the Moon notices the Sun is missing. The Moon then begins a journey to find the Sun, and tell him to come back to Earth. On the way, the Moon talks to each of the planets, who give their opinions or advice on the situation. At the end, the Sun tells the Moon that he never left, and the Moon begins the journey back.

Development 
The first alpha version of 6180 the moon took one hour and forty-three minutes (6180 seconds) to make, before adding in the story, or most of the other levels and worlds that appear in the finished game.

Reception 
6180 the moon was received very positively. John Walker of Rock, Paper, Shotgun called it "a very pretty thing", and Spencer Hayes of Destructoid said "There is something about [puzzle platformers] that just doesn't click with me like they did before. Except for 6180 The Moon. That game is rad." In a review that has garnered 300 thousand views, the late influential game reviewer TotalBiscuit said the game is "brilliant... Really impressive... A fantastic piece of work." Phil Spencer, Executive Vice President of Xbox, wrote "This game is on Steam tomorrow, worth getting it. #6180themoon, another one we need on xb1."

References 

2014 video games
Indie video games
Linux games
MacOS games
Monochrome video games
New Nintendo 3DS games
Nintendo Switch games
Puzzle-platform games
Video games developed in South Korea
Wii U games
Windows games
Xbox One games
Single-player video games